Jamaica–Turkey relations are foreign relations between Jamaica and Turkey. Neither country has a resident ambassador.

Diplomatic relations 

Turkey and Jamaica had friendly relations since Jamaica's independence. On August 7, 1962, following the independence, Prime Minister Bustamante confirmed Jamaican foreign policy as pro-Western and anticommunist. In the 1970s, relations were strained under Prime Minister Manley, who championed relations with Cuba and the Soviet Union to effect economic development of Jamaica. Relations improved again when Edward Seaga replaced Norman Manley as Prime Minister in 1980. Prime Minister Seaga reversed pro-Cuban and pro-socialist foreign policy. As a consequence of friendly relations, Turkish foreign aid to Jamaica increased tenfold to reach US$12.5 million between 1981 and 1986.

Economic relations 
 Trade volume between the two countries was US$90.5 million in 2019 (Turkish exports/imports: 90/0.5 million USD).

See also 

 Foreign relations of Jamaica
 Foreign relations of Turkey

References

Further reading 

 "Democracy and Socialism in Jamaica, 1962-79," Journal of Commonwealth and Comparative Politics [London], 19, No. 2, July 1981, pp. 115–33.
 "Jamaica's 1980 Elections: What Manley Did Do; What Seaga Need Do," Caribbean Review, 10, No. 2, Spring 1981, pp. 5–7.
 "Jamaica in Crisis: From Socialist to Capitalist Management," International Journal, 40, Spring 1985, pp. 282–311.
  "Jamaican Migrants and the Cuban Sugar Industry, 1900-1934." pp. 94–114 in Manuel Moreno Fraginals, Frank Moya Pons, and Stanley Engerman (eds.), Between Slavery and Free Labor: The Spanish-Speaking Caribbean in the Nineteenth Century. Baltimore: Johns Hopkins University Press, 1985.
 "Running Out of Options in Jamaica: Seaga and Manley Compared," Caribbean Review, 15, No. 3, Winter 1987, pp. 10–12. 
 "Seaga Is in Trouble: Polling the Jamaican Polity in MidTerm," Caribbean Review, 11, No. 4, Fall 1982, pp. 5–7.
 "The 1976 Parliamentary Election in Jamaica," Journal of Commonwealth and Comparative Politics [London], 15, No. 3, November 1977, pp. 250–65.
 "The Jamaican Reaction: Grenada and the Political Stalemate," Caribbean Review, 12, No. 4, Fall 1983, pp. 31–32.
 "The Transition to Mass Parties and Ideological Politics: The Jamaican Experience since 1972," Comparative Political Studies, 19, No. 4, January 1987, pp. 443–83.
 Ashby, Timothy. "The U.S. Message for Jamaica's Seaga: It's Time to Keep Your Promise," Backgrounder, September 2, 1986, p. 12. 
 Ashley, Paul. "The Commonwealth Caribbean and the Contemporary World Order: The Cases of Jamaica and Trinidad." pp. 159–76 in Paget Henry and Carl Stone (eds.), The Newer Caribbean: Decolonization, Democracy, and Development. (Inter-American Politics series, 4.) Philadelphia: Institute for the Study of Human Issues, 1983.
 Ayub, Mahmood Ali. Made in Jamaica: The Development of the Manufacturing Sector. (World Bank Staff Occasional Papers, No. 31 .) Baltimore: Johns Hopkins University Press, 1981.
 Bell, Wendell. "Independent Jamaica Enters World Politics: Foreign Policy in a New State," Political Science Quarterly, 92, Winter 1977–78, pp. 683–703.
 Bernal, Richard L. "The Vicious Circle of Foreign Indebtedness: The Case of Jamaica." pp. 111–28 in Antonio Jorge, Jorge Salazar-Carrillo, and Frank Diaz-Pou (eds.), External Debt and Development Strategy in Latin America. New York: Pergamon Press, 1985.
 Black, Clinton V. The Story of Jamaica: From Prehistory to the Present. London: Collins, 1965.
 Boiling, H. Christine. Jamaica: Factors Affecting Its Capacity to Import Food. (Department of Agriculture, Foreign Agriculture Economic Reports, 176.) Washington: GPO, 1983.
 Braithwaite, Edward. The Development of Creole Society in Jamaica, 1770–1820. New York: Oxford University Press, 1971.
 Campbell, Mavis C. The Dynamics of Change in a Slave Society: A Sociopolitical History of the Free Coloreds of Jamaica, 1800–1865. Cranbury, New Jersey: Associated University Presses, 1976.
 Clarke, Edith. My Mother Who Fathered Me: A Study of the Family in Three Selected Communities in Jamaica. London: Allen and Unwin, 1957.
 Cobb, Charles E., Jr. "Jamaica: Hard Times, High Hopes," National Geographic, 167, No. 1, January 1985, pp. 114–40.
 Craton, Michael, and James Walvin. A Jamaican Plantation: The History of Worthy Park, 1670–1970. London: Allen, 1970.
 Davis, Stephen, and Peter Simon. Reggae Bloodlines: In Search of the Music and Culture of Jamaica, (rev. ed.) New York: Anchor Books, 1979.
 Duncan, Cameron. "The IMF and Jamaica." Washington: Department of Economics, The American University, 1986. 
 Edie, Carlene J. "Domestic Politics and External Relations in Jamaica under Michael Manley, 1972-1980," Studies in Comparative International Development, 21, Spring 1986, pp. 71–94. 
 Forbes, John D. Jamaica: Managing Political and Economic Change. (AEI Special Analyses.) Washington: American Enterprise Institute, 1985.
 Girvan, Norman. Foreign Capital and Underdevelopment in Jamaica. Mona, Jamaica: Institute of Social and Economic Research, University of the West Indies, 1971.
 Hall, Douglas. Free Jamaica, 1838-1865: An Economic History. New Haven: Yale University Press, 1959. Reprinted, London: 1976. 
 Heuman, Gad J. Between Black and White: Race, Politics, and the Free Coloreds in Jamaica, 1 792–1865. Westport, Connecticut: Greenwood Press, 1981.
 Higman, Barry W. Slave Population and Economy in Jamaica, 1807–1834. Cambridge: Cambridge University Press, 1976.
 Hurwitz, Samuel J. Jamaica: A Historical Portrait. New York: Praeger, 1971.
 Kaufman, Michael. Jamaica under Manley: Dilemmas of Socialism and Democracy. Westport, Connecticut: Lawrence Hill, 1985. 
 Koslofsky, Joanne. "Going Foreign: Causes of Jamaican Migration," NACLA Report on the Americas, 15, No. 1, January–February 1981, pp. 2–24.
 Lindsay, Louis. The Myth of Independence: Middle Class Politics and Non-Mobilization in Jamaica. Mona, Jamaica: Institute of Social and Economic Research, University of the West Indies, 1975.
 Looney, Robert E. The Jamaican Economy in the 1980s: Economic Decline and Structural Adjustment. Boulder: Westview Press, 1987. 
 McFarlane, CP. Facts on Jamaica: Physiography. Kingston, Jamaica: Department of Statistics, 1973.
 Massing, Michael. "The Jamaican Experiment," Atlantic Monthly, 252, September 1983, pp. 37–51.
 Morgan, Janet. "Blueprint Island: A Survey of Jamaica," Economist [London], 286, February 12, 1983, pp. 1–18.
 Munroe, Trevor. The Politics of Constitutional Decolonization: Jamaica, 1944–62. Mona, Jamaica: Institute of Social and Economic Research, University of the West Indies, 1972.
 Nettleford, Rex M. Identity, Race, and Protest in Jamaica. New York: Morrow, 1972.
 O'Shaughnessy, Hugh. "Behind the Violence in Jamaica: Political and Economic Pressures on the Manley Government," Round Table: The Commonwealth Journal of International Affairs [London], No. 264, October 1976, pp. 379–87.
 Oxfam. Debt and Poverty: A Case Study of Jamaica. London: 1985. Pan American Health Organization. "AIDS Surveillance in the Americas: Report Through 31 December 1985," Epidemiological Bulletin, 7, No. 2, 1986, pp. 7–8.
 Payne, Anthony. "From Michael with Love: The Nature of Socialism in Jamaica,''' Journal of Commonwealth and Comparative Politics [London], 14, No. 1, March 1976, pp. 82-100.
 Seyler, Daniel J. "The Politics of Development: The Case of Jamaica and the Caribbean Basin Initiative." Washington: School of International Service, The American University, 1986.
 Sharpley, Jennifer. "Jamaica, 1972-80." pp. 115–63 in Tony Killick (ed.), The IMF and Stabilization: Developing Country Experiences. New York: St. Martin's Press, 1984.
 Stephens, Evelyne Huber, and John D. Stephens. "Bauxite and Democratic Socialism in Jamaica." pp. 33–66 in Peter Evans, Dietrich Rueschemeyer, and Evelyne Huber Stephens (eds.), States Versus Markets in the World System. Beverly Hills: Sage, 1985. 
 Stephens, E.H., and John D. Stephens. Democratic Socialism in Jamaica. Princeton: Princeton University Press. 1986.
 Stone, Carl. "Class and the Institutionalisation of Two-Party Politics in Jamaica," Journal of Commonwealth and Comparative Politics [London], 14, No. 2, July 1976, pp. 177–96.
 Stone, Carl. Class. Race, and Political Behaviour in Urban Jamaica. Mona, Jamaica: Institute of Social and Economic Research. University of the West Indies, 1973.
 Two Jamaicas: The Role of Ideas in a Tropical Colony, 1830–1865. Cambridge: Harvard University Press, 1955. Reissued, New York: Atheneum, 1970.
Eaton, George E. Alexander Bustamante and Modern Jamaica. Kingston, Jamaica: Kingston, 1975.
 Tollefson, Scott D. "Jamaica: The Limits of a Showcase Policy," SAIS Review, 5, No. 2, Summer-Fall 1985, pp. 189–204.

 
Turkey
Bilateral relations of Turkey